The 2017 Canada Sevens was the second edition of the Canada Sevens tournament, and the sixth tournament of the 2016–17 World Rugby Sevens Series. The tournament was played on 11–12 March 2017 at BC Place in Vancouver, BC.

Format
The teams were drawn into four pools of four teams each. Each team plays all the others in their pool once. 3, 2 or 1 points for a win, draw or loss. The top two teams from each pool advance to the Cup brackets. The bottom two teams go into the Challenge trophy brackets.

Teams
The tournament will consist of the fifteen core teams plus Chile, who qualified by finishing as the best ranked non-core team of the 2017 Sudamérica Rugby Sevens.

Pool stage

Pool A

Pool B

Pool C

Pool D

Knockout stage

13th Place

Challenge Trophy

5th Place

Cup

Tournament placings

Source: World Rugby (archived)

References

External links
 World Rugby Sevens Series website

Canada Sevens
Canada Sevens
Canada Sevens
Canada Sevens